Hilde Van Mieghem (born 14 April 1958, in Antwerp) is a Belgian actress.

Filmography
This is a partial list of films.

Directing
2004: De Kus (English title The Kiss)
2006: Love Belongs to Everyone
2010: Smoorverliefd (Belgian version)
2013: Smoorverliefd (Dutch version)
2017: Sprakeloos

Films 
Vrijdag (1980)
Toute une nuit (1982)
De witte waan (1984)
Blonde Dolly (1987)
Pink Palace, Paradise Beach (1987)
Skin (1987)
Sailors Don't Cry (1988)
Spelen of sterven (1990)
Kuchnia Polska (1991)
Kafka (1991)
Seventh Heaven (1993)
De wereld van Ludovic (1993)
Wildgroei (1994)
 (1997)
Hombres Complicados (1997)
De suikerpot (1997)
Dandelion Game (1998)
Four for Venice (1998)
Shades (1999)
De Bal (1999)
En vacances (2000)
Maria (2000)
Die 8. Todsünde: Das Toskana-Karussell (2002)
Alias (2002)
Angst (2003)
Bathroom Story (2004)
The Ketchup Song (2004)
 (2005)
Vermist (2007)
 (2008)
Vox Populi (2008)
Amsterdam (2009)
Spider in the Web (2019), as Anne-Marie.

Television Acting
Het wassende water (1986)
Adriaen Brouwer (1986)
Moordspel (1987)
L'heure Simenon (1988)
La mort d'Auguste (1988)
Der Fuchs (1989)
Commissaris Roos (1990)
Mama mijn papa (1990)
Oog in oog (1991)
Moeder, waarom leven wij? (1991)
Kuchnia Polska (1993)
Bex & Blanche (1993)
Le trajet de la foudre (1994)
Zwei zum Verlieben (1996)
De Wolkenfabriek (1996)
Le père Fouettard (1997)
Quai n° 1 (1997)
Over de liefde (1997)
Haar aanblik is mij welgevallig (1997)
Zwei Asse und ein König (2000)
Klinik unter Palmen (2001)
Recht op Recht (2001)
Russen (2003)
Sedes & Belli (2003)
Witse (2004)
De Kavijaks (2005)
Vermist (2008)
De Smaak van De Keyser (2008)
In Vlaamse velden (2013)
The Team (2015)
De Bunker (2015)
Tabula Rasa (2017)

References

External links 

1958 births
Living people
Belgian film actresses
Belgian television actresses